Danny Eyre is an American politician and a Republican former member of the Wyoming House of Representatives representing District 19 from January 10, 2017 until January 10, 2023.

Elections

2016
When incumbent Republican Representative Allen Jaggi announced his retirement, Eyre declared his candidacy for the seat. Eyre ran unopposed in the Republican primary and defeated Democrat Mel McCreary in the general election with 85% of the vote.

Personal life
Eyre is a member of the Church of Jesus Christ of Latter-day Saints.

References

External links
Official page at the Wyoming Legislature
Profile from Ballotpedia

Living people
Republican Party members of the Wyoming House of Representatives
People from Lyman, Wyoming
Latter Day Saints from Wyoming
Year of birth missing (living people)
21st-century American politicians